Child protective services (CPS) is the name of a government agency in many states of the United States responsible for providing child protection, which includes responding to reports of child abuse or neglect. Some states use other names, often attempting to reflect more family-centered (as opposed to child-centered) practices, such as department of children and family services (DCFS). CPS is also sometimes known by the name of department of social services (DSS or simply social services for short), though these terms more often have a broader meaning.

List of other names and acronyms for CPS:

 Children, youth, and family –  CYF
Department of children and families – DCF
Department of children and family services – DCFS
Department of social services – DSS
Department of human services – DHS
Department of child safety – DCS
Department of child services – DCS
Department of human resources – DHR
CPS/DCF is a department under a state's health and human services organization.

Laws and standards

Federal

U.S. federal laws that govern CPS agencies include:
Child Abuse Prevention and Treatment Act (CAPTA)
Indian Child Welfare Act (ICWA)
Multi-Ethnic Placement Act (MEPA)
Adoption and Safe Families Act (ASFA)
Section 504 of the Rehabilitation Act of 1973  (Section 504)
 Title II of the Americans with Disabilities Act of 1990 (ADA)
42 U.S.C. Section 1983, and depending on the circumstances, 1985
Social Security Act of 1935

History
In 1690, in what is now the Americas, there were criminal court cases involving child abuse. In 1692, states and municipalities identified care for abused and neglected children as the responsibility of local government and private institutions. In 1696, The Kingdom of England first used the legal principle of parens patriae, which gave the royal crown care of "charities, infants, idiots, and lunatics returned to the chancery". This principle of parens patriae has been identified as the statutory basis for U.S. governmental intervention in families' child rearing practices.

In 1825, states enacted laws giving social-welfare agencies the right to remove neglected children from their parents and from the streets. These children were placed in almshouses, in orphanages and with other families. In 1835, the Humane Society founded the National Federation of Child Rescue agencies to investigate child maltreatment. In the late-19th century, private child protection agencies—modeled after existing animal protection organizations—developed to investigate reports of child maltreatment, present cases in court and advocate for child welfare legislation.

In 1853, the Children's Aid Society was founded in response to the problem of orphaned or abandoned children living in New York City. Rather than allow these children to become institutionalized or continue to live on the streets, the children were placed in the first "foster" homes, typically with the intention of helping these families work their farms as family labor.

In 1874, the first case of child abuse was criminally prosecuted in what has come to be known as the "case of Mary Ellen". Outrage over this case started an organized effort against child maltreatment In 1909, President Theodore Roosevelt convened the White House Conference on Child Dependency, which created a publicly funded volunteer organization to "establish and publicize standards of child care". By 1926, 18 states had some version of county child welfare boards whose purpose was to coordinate public and private child related work. Issues of abuse and neglect were addressed in the Social Security Act in 1930, which provided funding for intervention for "neglected and dependent children in danger of becoming delinquent".

In 1912, the federal children's bureau was established with a mandate that included services related to child maltreatment. In 1958, amendments to the Social Security Act mandated that states fund child protection efforts. In 1962, professional and media interest in child maltreatment was sparked by the publication of C. Henry Kempe and associates' "The battered child syndrome" in the JAMA. By the mid-1960s, in response to public concern that resulted from this article, 49 U.S. states passed child-abuse reporting laws. In 1974, these efforts by the states culminated in the passage of the federal Child Abuse Prevention and Treatment Act (CAPTA) providing federal funding for wide-ranging federal and state child-maltreatment research and services. In 1980, Congress passed the first comprehensive federal child protective services act, the Adoption Assistance and Child Welfare Act of 1980, which focused on family preservation efforts to help keep families together and children out of foster care or other out-of-home placement options.

Partly funded by the federal government, child protective services (CPS) agencies were first established in response to the 1974 CAPTA, which mandated that all states establish procedures to investigate suspected incidents of child maltreatment.

In the 1940s and 1950s, due to improved technology in diagnostic radiology, the medical profession began to take notice of what they believed to be intentional injuries, the so-called "shaken baby syndrome". In 1961, Kempe began to further research this issue, eventually identifying and coining the term battered child syndrome. At this same time, there were also changing views about the role of children in society, fueled in part by the Civil Rights Movement.

In 1973, Congress took the first steps toward enacting federal legislature to address the issues of poverty and minorities. The CAPTA was passed in 1974, which required states "to prevent, identify and treat child abuse and neglect".

Shortly thereafter, in 1978, the Indian Child Welfare Act (ICWA) was passed in response to attempts to destroy the Native Americans by taking large numbers of Native American children, separating them from their tribes and placing them in foster care or sending them to far away schools where many were maltreated, lost and some died. This legislation not only opened the door for consideration of cultural issues while stressing ideas that children should be with their families, leading to the beginnings of family preservation programs. In 1980, the Adoption Assistance and Child Welfare Act was introduced as a way to manage the high numbers of children in placement. Although this legislation addressed some of the complaints from earlier pieces of legislation around the elimination of due process for parents, these changes were not designed to alleviate the high numbers of children in placement or continuing delays in permanence. This led to the introduction of the home visitation models, which provided funding to private agencies to provide parents with intensive services as an alternative to adoption.

In addition to family services, the focus of federal child welfare policy changed to try to address permanence for the large numbers of foster children care. Several pieces of federal legislation attempted to ease the process of adoption and taking away parental rights, including incentives for adoption and removal with the Adoption Assistance Act; the 1988 Child Abuse Prevention, Adoption, and Family Services Act; and the 1992 Child Abuse, Domestic Violence, Adoption, and Family Services Act. The 1994 Multi-Ethnic Placement Act, which was revised in 1996 to add the Interethnic Placement Provisions, also attempted to promote permanency through adoption, creating regulations that adoptions could not be delayed or denied due to issues of  parental rights, the children's right, discrimination, race, color, or national origin of the child or the adoptive parent.

All of these policies led up to the 1997 Adoption and Safe Families Act (ASFA), much of which guides current practice. Changes in the Adoptions and Safe Families Act shifted the emphasis towards children's health and safety concerns and away from a policy of reuniting children with their birth parents without regard to prior abusiveness. This law requires counties to provide "reasonable efforts" to preserve or reunify families, but required that states move to terminate parental rights for children who had been in foster care for 15 out of the last 22 months, with several exceptions.

Comparison to other similar systems

Brazil
For decades, before 1990, there had been pressure from NGOs and children's organizations for protecting children battered by poverty and hunger and despised by sections of the community in Brazil. After this, became a chapter on the rights of children and adolescents in the Constitution of the Federative Republic of Brazil. In 1990, an even greater victory, when the Statute of the Child and Adolescent was approved ligating the government to protect child rights. This ensured a comprehensive child welfare system in Brazil. To ensure that the statute's provisions are enforced, councils for the rights of the child and adolescent were set up at federal, state and local levels.

The National Council for the Rights of Children and Adolescents (CONANDA) is a federal authority. The councils of guardianship are the local authorities and have duties and responsibilities towards children in their area. All work is based in the Statute of the Child and Adolescents (Law No. 8,069, July 13, 1990).

Canada
In Ontario, services are provided by independent children's aid societies. The societies receive funding from, and are under the supervision of the Ontario Ministry of Children and Youth Services. However, they are regarded as a non-governmental organization (NGO) which allows the CAS a large degree of autonomy from interference or direction in the day-to-day running of CAS by the ministry. The Child and Family Services Review Board exists to investigate complaints against CAS and maintains authority to act against the societies.

The federal government passed Bill C-92—officially known as An Act Respecting First Nations, Inuit and Métis Children, Youth and Families—in June 2019 coming into force on January 1, 2020. The new legislation creates national standards on how Indigenous children are to be treated. For example, when looking to place kids in foster care, authorities are to prioritize extended family and home communities. The law also allows Indigenous communities to create their own child welfare laws. Indigenous children make up 7% of Canada's population, but represent about 50% of youth in care.

Costa Rica
The Patronato Nacional de la Infancia (PANI) is responsible for child protection in Costa Rica.

The agency was founded in 1930 by Luis Felipe Gonzalez Flores, a Costa Rican magnate at the time. It was founded to combat infant mortality, that at the time, was rampant in Costa Rica. The idea was to put infants up for adoption that the mother could not afford to support (abortion is a crime in Costa Rica).

In 1949, after the Costa Rican Civil War, a new constitution was written, it called for the agency to be an autonomous institution in the government, autonomous from any ministry.

Today the focus is on the UN Convention on the Rights of the Child. The agency still favors adoption, since abortion is illegal in Costa Rica.

United Kingdom
The United Kingdom has a comprehensive child welfare system under which local authorities have duties and responsibilities towards children in need in their area. This covers provision of advice and services, accommodation and care of children who become uncared for, and also the capacity to initiate proceedings for the removal of children from their parents care/care proceedings. The criteria for the latter is "significant harm" which covers physical, sexual and emotional abuse and neglect. In appropriate cases the care plan before the court will be for adoption. The local authorities also run adoption services both for children put up for adoption voluntarily and those becoming available for adoption through court proceedings. The basic legal principle in all public and private proceedings concerning children, under the Children Act 1989, is that the welfare of the child is paramount. In recognition of attachment issues, social work good practice requires a minimal number of moves and the 1989 Children Act enshrines the principle that delay is inimical to a child's welfare. Care proceedings have a time frame of 26 weeks (although capable of extension under certain circumstances) and concurrent planning is required. The final care plan put forward by the local authority is required to provide a plan for permanence, whether with parents, family members, long-term foster parents or adopters. The court routinely joins children as parties to their own care proceedings, and their best interests are explored and advanced by children's guardians, independent social workers who specialise in representation of children in proceedings. It is a feature of care proceedings that judges of all levels are expected to adhere to the recommendations of the children's guardian unless there are cogent reasons not to. Nevertheless, "drift" and multiple placements still occur as many older children are difficult to place or maintain in placements. The role of independent visitor, a voluntary post, was created in the United Kingdom under the 1989 Children Act to befriend and assist children and young people in care.

In England, Wales and Scotland, there has never been a statutory obligation to report alleged child abuse to the police. However both the Children Act 1989 and 2004 make clear a statutory obligation to all professionals to report suspected child abuse.

The statutory guidance Working Together to Safeguard Children 2006 created the role of "local authority designated officer". This officer is responsible for managing allegations of abuse against adults who work with children (teachers, social workers, church leaders, youth workers etc.).

Local safeguarding children boards (LSCBs) are responsible ensuring agencies and professionals, in their area, effectively safeguard and promote the welfare of children. In the event of the death or serious injury of a child, LSCBs can initiate a "Serious Case Review" aimed at identifying agency failings and improving future practice.

The planned ContactPoint database, under which information on children is shared between professionals, has been halted by the newly elected coalition government (May 2010). The database was aimed at improving information sharing across agencies. Lack of information sharing had been identified as a failing in numerous high-profile child death cases. Critics of the scheme claimed it was evidence of a "big brother state" and too expensive to introduce.

Working Together to Safeguard Children 2006 (updated in 2010) and the subsequent The Protection of Children in England: A Progress Report (Laming, 2009) continue to promote the sharing of data between those working with vulnerable children.

A child in suitable cases can be made a ward of the court and no decisions about the child or changes in its life can be made without the leave of the High Court.

In England the murder of Victoria Climbié was largely responsible for various changes in child protection in England, including the formation of the Every Child Matters programme in 2003. A similar programme, Getting it Right for Every Child – GIRFEC, was established in Scotland in 2008.

A bill is being debated in the UK parliament which many people and organisations fear will take away the statutory duty local authorities have to protect vulnerable children.

Effects of early maltreatment of children
Children with histories of maltreatment, such as physical and psychological neglect, physical abuse, and sexual abuse, are at risk of developing psychiatric problems. Such children are at risk of developing a disorganized attachment. Disorganized attachment is associated with a number of developmental problems, including dissociative symptoms, as well as depressive, anxiety, and acting-out symptoms. Abuse and neglect also affect children and youth social and emotional development. Reason being is because of the negative affect on children's brain and cognitive development.

Standards for reporting
Generally speaking, a report must be made when an individual knows or has reasonable cause to believe or suspect that a child has been subjected to abuse or neglect. These standards guide mandatory reporters in deciding whether to make a report to child protective services. However, due to the policy of the business to protect the identity of the reporter many reports have been made due to conflict with other parents or hospitals/doctors being sued by parents concerned with the way their child's needs have been addressed.

Persons responsible for the child
In addition to defining acts or omissions that constitute child abuse or neglect, several states' statutes provide specific definitions of persons who can get reported to child protective services as perpetrators of abuse or neglect. These are persons who have some relationship or regular responsibility for the child. This generally includes parents, grandparents, guardians, foster parents, relatives, legal guardians or bystanders. Once taken away from home, the stated goal of CPS is to reunite the child with their family, however this is largely lip service.  In some cases, due to the nature of abuse children are not able to see or converse with the abusers. If parents fail to complete Court Ordered terms and conditions, the children in care may never return home. Most terms and conditions are set by the CPS caseworkers, not the courts.

Child protective services statistics

The United States government's Administration for Children and Families reported that in 2004 approximately 3.5 million children were involved in investigations of alleged abuse or neglect in the US, while an estimated 872,000 children were determined to have been abused or neglected, and an estimated 1,490 children died that year because of abuse or neglect. In 2007, 1,760 children died as the result of child abuse and neglect. Child abuse impacts the most vulnerable populations, with children under age five years accounting for 76% of fatalities. In 2008, 8.3 children per 1000 were victims of child abuse and neglect and 10.2 children per 1000 were in out of home placement.

On September 30, 2010, there were approximately 400,000 children in foster care in the U.S. of which 36% percent were ages 5 and under. During that same period, almost 120,000 birth to five year-olds entered foster care and a little under 100,000 exited foster care. U.S. Child Protective Services (CPS) received a little over 2.5 million reports of child maltreatment in 2009 of which 61.9% were assigned to an investigation. Research using national data on recidivism indicates that 22% of children were rereported within a two-year period and that 7% of these rereports were substantiated. In 2016, CPS within the state of Rhode Island demonstrated 2,074 cases of abuse or neglect among a population of 223,956 children.

As last reported in August 2019, 437,238 children nationally were removed from their families and placed in foster homes according to the federal government Adoption and Foster Care Analysis and Reporting System.

From August 1999 - August 2019, 9,073,607 American children have been removed from their families and placed in foster homes according to the federal government Adoption and Foster Care Analysis and Reporting System.

Child protective services recidivism in the United States
Two often-used terms in CPS recidivism are re-report (also known as re-referral) and recurrence. Either of the two can occur after an initial report of child abuse or neglect called an index report. Although the definitions of re-report and recurrence are not consistent, the general difference is that a re-report is a subsequent report of child abuse or neglect after an initial report (also known as an index report) whereas recurrence refers to a confirmed (also known as substantiated) re-report after an initial report of child abuse and neglect. Borrowing from the definition used by Pecora et al. (2000), recidivism is defined as, "Recurring child abuse and neglect, the subsequent or repeated maltreatment of a child after identification to public authorities."  This definition is not all-inclusive because it does not include abused children who are not reported to authorities.

Recidivism statistics
There are three main sources of recidivism data in the U.S.—the NCANDS, the NSCAW, and the NIS—and they all have their own respective strengths and weaknesses. The NCANDS was established in 1974, and it consists of administrative data of all reports of suspected child abuse and neglect investigated by CPS. The NSCAW was established in 1996 and is similar to the NCANDS in that it only includes reports of child abuse and neglect investigated by CPS, but it adds clinical measures related to child and family well-being that the NCANDS is lacking. The NIS was established in 1974, and it consists of data collected from CPS as well. However, it attempts to gather a more comprehensive picture of the incidence of child abuse and neglect by collecting data from other reporting sources called "community sentinels".

Criticism
Brenda Scott, in her 1994 book Out of Control: Who's Watching Our Child Protection Agencies, criticizes CPS, stating, "Child Protective Services is out of control. The system, as it operates today, should be scrapped. If children are to be protected in their homes and in the system, radical new guidelines must be adopted. At the core of the problem is the antifamily mindset of CPS. Removal is the first resort, not the last. With insufficient checks and balances, the system that was designed to protect children has become the greatest perpetrator of harm."

Texas
The Texas Department of Family and Protective Services had itself been an object of reports of unusual numbers of poisonings, death, rapes and pregnancies of children under its care since 2004. The Texas Family and Protective Services Crisis Management Team was created by executive order after the critical report Forgotten Children of 2004.

Texas Child Protective Services was hit with a rare if not unprecedented legal sanction for a "groundless cause of action" and ordered to pay $32,000 of the Spring family's attorney fees. Judge Schneider wrote in a 13-page order, "The offensive conduct by (CPS) has significantly interfered with the legitimate exercise of the traditional core functions of this court."

2008 Raid of YFZ Ranch

In April 2008, the largest child protection action in American history raised questions as the CPS in Texas removed hundreds of minor children, infants, and women incorrectly believed to be children from the YFZ Ranch polygamist community, with the assistance of heavily armed police with an armored personnel carrier. Investigators, including supervisor Angie Voss convinced a judge that all of the children were at risk of child abuse because they were all being groomed for under-age marriage. The state supreme court disagreed, releasing most children back to their families. Investigations would result in criminal charges against some men in the community.

Gene Grounds of Victim Relief Ministries commended CPS workers in the Texas operation as exhibiting compassion, professionalism and caring concern. However, CPS performance was questioned by workers from the Hill Country Community Mental Health-Mental Retardation Center. One wrote "I have never seen women and children treated this poorly, not to mention their civil rights being disregarded in this manner" after assisting at the emergency shelter. Others who were previously forbidden to discuss conditions working with CPS later produced unsigned written reports expressed anger at the CPS traumatizing the children, and disregarding rights of mothers who appeared to be good parents of healthy, well-behaved children. CPS threatened some MHMR workers with arrest, and the entire mental health support was dismissed the second week due to being "too compassionate". Workers believed poor sanitary conditions at the shelter allowed respiratory infections and chicken pox to spread.

CPS problem reports
The Texas Department of Family and Protective Services, as with other states, had itself been an object of reports of unusual numbers of poisonings, death, rapes and pregnancies of children under its care since 2004. The Texas Family and Protective Services Crisis Management Team was created by executive order after the critical report Forgotten Children of 2004. Texas Comptroller Carole Keeton Strayhorn made a statement in 2006 about the Texas foster care system. In Fiscal 2003, 2004 and 2005, respectively 30, 38 and 48 foster children died in the state's care. The number of foster children in the state's care increased 24 percent to 32,474 in Fiscal 2005, while the number of deaths increased 60 percent. Compared to the general population, a child is four times more likely to die in the Texas foster care system. In 2004, about 100 children were treated for poisoning from medications; 63 were treated for rape that occurred while under state care, including four-year-old twin boys, and 142 children gave birth, though others believe Ms. Strayhorn's report was not scientifically researched, and that major reforms need to be put in place to assure that children in the conservatorship of the state get as much attention as those at risk in their homes.

Disproportionality and disparity in the child welfare system
In the United States, data suggests that a disproportionate number of minority children, particularly African American and Native American children, enter the foster care system. National data in the United States provides evidence that disproportionality may vary throughout the course of a child's involvement with the child welfare system. Differing rates of disproportionality are seen at key decision points including the reporting of abuse, substantiation of abuse, and placement into foster care. Additionally, once they enter foster care, research suggests that they are likely to remain in care longer.
Research has shown that there is no difference in the rate of abuse and neglect among minority populations when compared to Caucasian children that would account for the disparity.
The juvenile justice system has also been challenged by disproportionate negative contact of minority children. Because of the overlap in these systems, it is likely that this phenomenon within multiple systems may be related.

The  American Journal of Public Health  estimate that 37.4% of all children experience a child protective services investigation by age 18 years. Consistent with previous literature, they found a higher rate for African American children (53.0%) and the lowest rate for Asians and Pacific Islanders (10.2%). They conclude child maltreatment investigations are more common than is generally recognized when viewed across the lifespan. Building on other recent work, our data suggest a critical need for increased preventative and treatment resources in the area of child maltreatment.

Constitutional issues 
In May 2007, the United States 9th Circuit Court of Appeals found in Rogers v. County of San Joaquin, No. 05-16071 that a CPS social worker who removed children from their natural parents into foster care without obtaining judicial authorization was acting without due process and without exigency (emergency conditions) violated the 14th Amendment and Title 42 United States Code Section 1983. The Fourteenth Amendment to the United States Constitution says that a state may not make a law that abridges "... the privileges or immunities of citizens of the United States" and no state may "deprive any person of life, liberty, or property, without due process of law; nor deny to any person within its jurisdiction the equal protection of the laws". Title 42 United States Code Section 1983 states that citizens can sue in federal courts any person who acting under a color of law to deprive the citizens of their civil rights under the pretext of a regulation of a state, See.

In the case of Santosky v. Kramer, 455 US 745 (1982), the Supreme Court reviewed a case when the Department of Social Services removed two younger children from their natural parents only because the parents had been previously found negligent toward their oldest daughter. When the third child was only three days old, the DSS transferred him to a foster home on the ground that immediate removal was necessary to avoid imminent danger to his life or health. The Supreme Court vacated previous judgment and stated: "Before a State may sever completely and irrevocably the rights of parents in their natural child, due process requires that the State support its allegations by at least clear and convincing evidence. But until the State proves parental unfitness, the child and their parents share a vital interest in preventing erroneous termination of their natural relationship."

A District of Columbia Court of Appeals concluded that the lower trial court erred in rejecting the relative custodial arrangement selected by the natural mother who tried to preserve her relationship with the child. The previous judgment granting the foster mother's adoption petition was reversed, the case remanded to the trial court to vacate the orders granting adoption and denying custody, and to enter an order granting custody to the child's relative.

Notable lawsuits 
In 2010 an ex-foster child was awarded $30 million by jury trial in California (Santa Clara County) for sexual abuse damages that happened to him in foster home from 1995 to 1999; he was represented by attorney Stephen John Estey. The foster parent, John Jackson, was licensed by state despite the fact that he abused his own wife and son, overdosed on drugs and was arrested for drunken driving. In 2006, Jackson was convicted in Santa Clara County of nine counts of lewd or lascivious acts on a child by force, violence, duress, menace and fear and seven counts of lewd or lascivious acts on a child under 14, according to the Santa Clara County District Attorney's Office. The sex acts he forced the children in his foster care to perform sent him to prison for 220 years. Later in 2010, Giarretto Institute, the private foster family agency responsible for licensing and monitoring Jackson's foster home and others, also was found to be negligent and liable for 75 percent of the abuse that was inflicted on the victim, and Jackson was liable for the rest. This was a landmark case that has since set a precedent in future proceedings against the Department of Children and Families.

In 2009 the Oregon Department of Human Services agreed to pay $2 million into a fund for the future care of twins who were allegedly abused by their foster parents; it was the largest such settlement in the agency's history. According to the civil rights suit filed on request of twins' adoptive mother in December 2007 in U.S. Federal Court, children were kept in makeshift cages—cribs covered with chicken wire secured by duct tape—in a darkened bedroom known as "the dungeon". The brother and sister often went without food, water or human touch. The boy, who had a shunt put into his head at birth to drain fluid, did not receive medical attention, so when police rescued the twins he was nearly comatose. The same foster family previously took in their care hundreds of other children over nearly four decades. The DHS said the foster parents deceived child welfare workers during the checkup visits.

Several lawsuits were brought in 2008 against the Florida Department of Children & Families (DCF), accusing it of mishandling reports that Thomas Ferrara, 79, a foster parent, was molesting girls. The suits claimed that though there were records of sexual misconduct allegations against Ferrara in 1992, 1996, and 1999, the DCF continued to place foster children with Ferrara and his wife until 2000. Ferrara was arrested in 2001 after a nine-year-old girl told detectives he regularly molested her over two years and threatened to hurt her mother if she told anyone. Records show that Ferrara had as many as 400 children go through his home during his 16 years as a licensed foster parent from 1984 to 2000. Officials stated that the lawsuits over Ferrara end up costing the DCF almost $2.26 million. Similarly, in 2007, Florida's DCF paid $1.2 million to settle a lawsuit that alleged the DCF ignored complaints that another mentally challenged Immokalee girl was being raped by her foster father, Bonifacio Velazquez, until the 15-year-old gave birth to a child.

In a class action lawsuit Charlie and Nadine H. v. McGreevey was filed in federal court by "Children's Rights" New York organization on behalf of children in the custody of the New Jersey Division of Youth and Family Services (DYFS). The complaint alleged violations of the children's constitutional rights and their rights under Title IV-E of the Social Security Act, the Child Abuse Prevention and Treatment Act, Early Periodic Screening Diagnosis and Treatment, 504 of the Rehabilitation Act, the Americans with Disabilities Act, and the Multiethnic Placement Act (MEPA). In July 2002, the federal court granted plaintiffs' experts access to 500 children's case files, allowing plaintiffs to collect information concerning harm to children in foster care through a case record review. These files revealed numerous cases in which foster children were abused, and the DYFS failed to take proper action. On June 9, 2004, the child welfare panel appointed by the parties approved the NJ state's reform plan. The court accepted the plan on June 17, 2004. The same organization filed similar lawsuits against other states in recent years that caused some of the states to start child welfare reforms.

In 2007, with Shawn McMillan as her lead trial attorney, Deanna Fogarty-Hardwick obtained a jury verdict against Orange County (California) and two of its social workers for violating her Fourteenth Amendment rights to familial association. The $4.9 million verdict grew to a $9.5 million judgment as the county lost each of its successive appeals. The case finally ended in 2011 when the United States Supreme Court denied Orange County's request to overturn the verdict. During the appeals process it was argued by the defense attorneys that the caseworkers had a right to fabricate evidence and lie to the court in order to facilitate the continued removal of the child from her family. This case, which has come to be called the "right to lie" case set a precedent of how caseworkers can handle cases to which they are assigned. It was adamantly argued, by the defense, that caseworkers should be allowed to make up things in order to sway the judges decision to remove a child from his or her fit parents. The defense attorney even tried to justify the right of the caseworkers to lie saying that the statutes which cover perjury are "state statutes".

In 2018 Rafaelina Duval obtained a jury verdict against Los Angeles County (California) and two of its social workers for an unwarranted seizure of her child. The board of supervisors approved a $6 million payout for Duval, who said her 15-month-old baby was seized by county social workers against her rights. Her son, Ryan, was taken on November 3, 2009, after social workers Kimberly Rogers and Susan Pender accused Duval of general neglect and intentionally starving the boy, according to a statement issued by Duval's attorney, Shawn McMillan, following the jury verdict. "The law is very clear and the social workers get training on this, you cannot seize a child from its parents unless there's an emergency," McMillan said.

In 2019, with the assistance of attorney McMillan, Rachel Bruno obtained an award against social services and Children's Hospital of Orange County (CHOC) after they took her 20-month-old son and ran unauthorized medical tests on him and injected him with a dozen vaccinations at the same time.

California
In April 2013, Child Protective Services in Sacramento sent in police to forcibly remove a five-month-old baby from the care of parents.

Alex and Anna Nikolayev took their baby Sammy out of Sutter Memorial Hospital and sought a second opinion at Kaiser Permanente, a competing hospital, for Sammy's flu-like symptoms. Police arrived at Kaiser and questioned the couple and doctors. Once Sammy had been fully cleared to leave the hospital, the couple went home, but the following day police arrived and took Sammy. On June 25, 2013, the case against the family was dismissed and the family filed a lawsuit against CPS and the Sacramento Police Department.

In Stockton, California, two children were taken away from Vuk and Verica Nastić in June 2010 after the children's naked photos were found on the father's computer. Such photos are common in Serbian culture. Furthermore, parents claim that their ethnic and religious rights have been violated—children are not permitted to speak Serbian, nor to meet with their parents for orthodox Christmas. They could only meet their mother once a week. Children have suffered psychological trauma due to their separation from parents. A polygraph test showed that the father did not abuse the children. The trial was set for January 26. Psychologists from Serbia stated that a few hours of conversation with children are enough to see whether they have been abused. The children were taken from their family 7 months ago. The FBI started an investigation against the CPS. The children were reunited with their parents in February 2011.

Illinois 
Illinois Children and Family Services plays an important part in investigating and restoring children and families in order to better a society. As the Children Abused and Neglected Child Reporting Act of Illinois states, that upon receiving a report it is the responsibility of Department of Children and Families Services to conserve the health and safety of the child in any circumstances where the children experience abuse and neglect. Protective assistance to the child should be provided in order to maintain a proper mental health and psychological state for the child; which includes preserving family life whenever possible. Sadly, in the most extreme cases, child abuse results in the death of a child.  In 2016, there were 64 child maltreatment deaths reported in Illinois—a rate of 2.19 per 100,000 children (U.S. DHHS, 2018). From 2012 to 2016, Illinois' reported annual maltreatment-related deaths have been as high as 105 and as low as 64, with a decrease every year since 2014.

Family social workers 
If a mandated reporter or civilian  calls child protective services, A CPS caseworker will start an investigation. The caseworker has an obligation to  tell the truth and protect children in all cases.  CPS has an investigative department the caseworker for each department has different responsibilities and obligations. The investigator must visit each client in their homes and prove that the children and families are unfit to provide care to their child/children.  A parent or caregiver does not have to prove they are a good parent. CPS must prove they are a bad parent. The CPS case worker has to honestly evaluate and verify that there is no academic, behavioral nor social problems that could affect the development of the children. The social worker will continue visits until they feel the children and the family are  stable and there is not more signs of abuse or neglect. If situation does not improve, the social worker can intervene and take the child away from the family.  The CPS caseworker must prove there is imminent danger to the child's health and well-being and that and emergency situation is present to remove a child/children. If a child is removed from the home the Caseworker must attempt to place the child with a family.  If that is an impossibility the child will be placed in the foster care system where their life may be in more danger than it was with their parents.

Perpetrators 
The National Child Abuse and Neglect Data System (NCANDS) gathers and analyzes all screened-in referrals from the child protective services from all 50 states. It defines a perpetrator as someone who has caused or permitted the abuse and neglect of a child to had happened. As NCANDS data on 2018 shows, in Illinois, 17,431 out of 18,958 perpetrators, or 77%, are parents of their victims, 6.4 percent are relatives and 4.6 percent had a different relationship to the child3. Within those numbers, 40 percent of the victims were abused and neglected by a mother acting alone and 21.5 percent by father acting alone3. Compared to Wisconsin where 2,502 out of 2,753 perpetrators are parents of the victims. Alcohol abuse and drug abuse have been identified as major risk factors which will increase child maltreatment.3 Evidence shows that there is an increase of victims if parents consume drugs or alcohol.

Child protective services responsibilities and case load 
Illinois Children and Family Services is composed of social workers, a position which does not require a degree in social work and in many cases any degree beyond a high school diploma, who assist families and children in complicated situations where abuse and neglect are alleged. National Association of Social Workers sets professional standards for social workers in family support programs, parenting programs and family-based services. According to these standards, social workers must act ethically, in accord with service, social justice, integrity and respect toward the person. Furthermore, the standards emphasize the importance that a social worker should have on serving as an advocate for the physical health and mental health of the children, youth and their families. Moreover, social workers should be able to perform ongoing assessments in order to gather important information and intervene with adequate evidence in order to ensure safety of the child.

However, throughout the years, social workers have struggled with a lack of resources, large caseloads and poor education. Social workers have to perform screening, investigations and identify alternative responses. Some social workers might need to provide additional services depending on the number of coworkers in their agencies and resources. In 2018, NCANDS reported that Illinois has only 150 workers who perform intake and screening for child abuse and neglect, and only 953 workers that follow up on reports. This provides evidence that child welfare social workers may find their daily responsibilities to be challenging. Compared with Michigan that has 177 workers who perform intake and screening for child abuse and neglect, and 1,549 workers that follow up on reports.

In addition to the challenges of a lack of resources and large caseloads, the Office of Inspector General identified issues that hinder effective service delivery. Among individual professional social workers, cognitive fixation, knowledge deficit, and documentation burdens are problems. Among social worker teams, coordination and supervisory support are problems. And environmental conditions, such as policies, training, and service array can also be inadequate. Based on the U.S. Bureau of Labor Statistics individual and family services, social workers in 2018 had an annual mean wage of $42,972, which might be taken as a trivial amount compared to the amount of work that is needed from social workers. An example of fixable efforts is Annie E. Casey Foundation Human Services Workforce Initiative (AECF). The initiative focuses on recruiting and retaining social workers with training and support in order to provide an effective resource for children and their family. States are doing different partnerships with colleges and universities to provide recruitment strategies that could attract students to find interest in the career of social work.
[1] Legislative Information System, Illinois General Assembly, Children Abused and Neglected Child Reporting Act Source: P.A. 79-65 http://www.ilga.gov/legislation/ilcs/ilcs3.asp?ActID=1460&ChapterID=32

[2] Weiner, D., & Cull, M. (2019). Systemic review of critical incidents in intact family services. Chicago, IL: Chapin Hall at the University of Chicago. https://www.chapinhall.org/wp-content/uploads/Systemic-Review-Critical-Incidents.pdf

[3] Social Work, Child and Family Social Workers https://www.socialwork.org/careers/child-and-family-social-worker/

[4] U.S. Department of Health & Human Services, Administration for Children and Families, Administration on Children, Youth and Families, Children's Bureau. (2020). Child Maltreatment 2018. https://www.acf.hhs.gov/sites/default/files/cb/cm2018.pdf#page=21

[5] National Association of Social Workers (2019) NASW Standards for Social Work Practice in Child Welfare https://www.socialworkers.org/LinkClick.aspx?fileticket=_FIu_UDcEac%3d&portalid=0

[6] U.S Bureau of Labor Statistics, Occupational Employment Statistics and Wages.https://www.bls.gov/oes/2018/may/oes211021.htm

[7] Social Work Policy Institute, Child Welfare. 2010 http://www.socialworkpolicy.org/research/child-welfare-2.html

Effectiveness 
In a nationwide study, researchers examined children in 595 families over a period of nine years. They discovered that in the households where child abuse was substantiated by evidence, risk factors remained unchanged during interviews with the families. The study found that investigated subjects were not perceptibly different from noninvestigated subjects in social support, family functioning, poverty, maternal education, or child behavior problems after adjusting for baseline risk factors and that mothers of investigated subjects had more depressive symptoms than mothers of noninvestigated peers at the child's age of eight years.

See also 
 Aboriginal child protection
 Cinderella effect
 National Association of Social Workers
 Parenting coordinator

Similar organizations in other countries 
 Bureau Jeugdzorg and Raad voor de Kinderbescherming — Netherlands
 Jugendamt — Germany and Austria
 Children and Family Court Advisory and Support Service — England and Wales
 Patronato Nacional de la Infancia — in Costa Rica
 National Council for the Rights of Children and Adolescents (Conselho Nacional dos Direitos da Criança e do Adolescente – CONANDA) — Brazil
Norwegian Child Welfare Services
 Oranga Tamariki—Ministry for Children — New Zealand
 Odisha State Child Protection Society — Odisha, India
 Children's Aid Society, Ontario, Canada

Further reading

 Fong, K. (2020). "Getting Eyes in the Home: Child Protective Services Investigations and State Surveillance of Family Life." American Sociological Review, 85(4), 610–638.

References

Sources
Drake, B. & Jonson-Reid, M. (2007). A response to Melton based on the Best Available Data. Published in: Child Abuse & Neglect, Volume 31, Issue 4, April 2007, Pages 343–360.
Laird, David and Jennifer Michael (2006). "Budgeting Child Welfare: How will millions cut from the federal budget affect the child welfare system?" Published in: Child Welfare League of America, Children's Voice, Vol. 15, No. 4 (July/August 2006). Available on-line at: Child Welfare League of America: Childrens Voice.
Pecora, Peter J., James K. Whittaker, Anthony N. Maluccio, with Richard P. Barth and Robert D. Plotnick (1992). The Child Welfare Challenge: Policy, Practice, and Research. NY:Aldine de Gruyter.
Petr, Christopher G. (1998). Social Work with Children and their Families: Pragmatic Foundations. NY:Oxford University Press. .
Scott, Brenda (1994), "Out of Control. Who's Watching Our Child Protection Agencies?". Huntington House Publishers. ISBN paper. ISBN hardback.

External links

United States
MacLaren Hall Child Protection Institution Home Site History of Child Protection in America
U.S. Children's Bureau (CB), includes:
"Laws & Policies" – compendia of federal and state statutes
"State Statutes Search" – search engine of child-maltreatment-related state statutes with user-selectable criteria
"Definitions of Child Abuse and Neglect (2005)" – summary of the states' definitions
Snowfall – One family's account of CPS action
Child Welfare League of America
Child Shield USA
 Illegal and Unethical Adoptions of children in the U.S. | Divorce | Adoption
American Family Rights

Canada
Child Welfare League of Canada
 Life In Foster Care Is Like A Subway Ride (A CBC Radio documentary which takes you on a 13-minute virtual subway ride through foster care by a Canadian foster care survivor John Dunn)
How to Implement Child Protection Mediation

United Kingdom
 TV JOJ: I´m not leaving without my children. English version

Germany
 German Federal Office of Statistics, Statistics 1995–2012 outlining German Jugendamt activity

Child abuse in the United States
Law enforcement in the United States
Domestic violence-related organizations in the United States